Parnell Knob is a mountain in the Ridge and Valley Appalachians region of south central Pennsylvania. It is a feature sculptured by the hard dense Tuscarora quartzite of the Silurian age. Parnell Knob is conspicuous in that it rises abruptly above the relatively level Great Appalachian Valley.

References
Alan R. Geyer (1979) "Outstanding Geologic Features of Pennsylvania", Geological Survey of Pennsylvania

 

Mountains of Pennsylvania
Landforms of Franklin County, Pennsylvania